Giorgio Tuccinardi (born 22 December 1985 in Udine) is an Italian rower. He won a gold medal at the 2006 World Rowing Championships.

External links 
 

1985 births
Living people
Italian male rowers
Sportspeople from Udine
World Rowing Championships medalists for Italy